The EA Sports Ignite game engine (styled as EA SPORTS IGNITE) is a collection of video game technologies built by Electronic Arts and designed to make video game sports "alive". The technology was announced at Microsoft's Xbox One reveal event in May 2013 for three EA Sports franchise games for Xbox One and PlayStation 4: FIFA 14, Madden NFL 25 and NBA Live 14, all released in Fall 2013.

Capabilities 
Electronic Arts announced several features within the engine. Its Human Intelligence framework lets in-game players "think like real athletes", with the ability to make snap judgments, prepare for impact, and perform as a team player. For example, the new artificial intelligence creates a sense of urgency for computer players towards the end of an association football match to rush for more shots on goal. The True Player Motion framework makes players' bodies, limbs, and clothing each move according to physics. The Living Worlds framework models the stadium audience members and their behaviors individually. The audience will have expectations about the in-game sports matches, and will react accordingly to the match's progress. The Ignite artificial intelligence is able to use the next-gen hardware to handle four times as many calculations per second than older EA Sports titles. Animation detail is expected to improve "ten-fold".

Electronic Arts plans to use Ignite for future sports games and Frostbite for future action games (with the exception of Rory McIlroy PGA Tour, which also uses Frostbite, and current iterations of the Madden NFL, FIFA and NHL series, which use Frostbite instead of Ignite). The company had previously shared technology internally before moving to develop all future sports games on the same engine.

History 
Ignite was publicly announced at Microsoft's May 2013 Xbox One reveal event. Four upcoming EA Sports franchise games for Xbox One and PlayStation 4 were announced to be using the technology: FIFA 14, EA Sports UFC, Madden NFL 25, and NBA Live 14. Electronic Arts showed pre-rendered sequences of the games at the reveal event instead of real-time gameplay.

Games using the Ignite engine

References 

2013 software
Electronic Arts
Video game engines